The Yoshii River is a river in Okayama Prefecture, Japan.

References

Rivers of Okayama Prefecture
Rivers of Japan